Venegono Inferiore is a comune (municipality) in the Province of Varese in the Italian region Lombardy, located about  northwest of Milan and about  southeast of Varese.

Venegono Inferiore borders the following municipalities: Binago, Castelnuovo Bozzente, Castiglione Olona, Gornate-Olona, Lonate Ceppino, Tradate, Venegono Superiore.

Venegono Inferiore is named as the see of the seminary of the Roman Catholic Archdiocese of Milan, one of the biggest in Italy.

Demographic evolution

Elections 
On 25 May 2014 the candidate Mattia Premazzi was elected as the mayor of the city.
On 12 June 2019, Premazzi began his second mandate as the mayor of Venegono Inferiore, for the next 5 years, after winning the elections in May.

References

External links
The official site of the City Hall of Venegono Inferiore
The site of the Seminary whose main location is in Venegono Inferiore
The official site of the Parish SS. Giacomo e Filippo of Venegono Inferiore
Live Crib of Venegono Inferiore
The official site of the team "Friends of the Theater" of Venegono Inferiore
Parish Youth Club "Oratorio Immacolata" of Venegono Inferiore
LAAV, a Seniors Center of Venegono Inferiore

Cities and towns in Lombardy